You.com is a search engine built in Palo Alto, California, United States that summarizes web results using website categories, contrary to a traditional search engine which shows a list of links. The search engine was founded by former Salesforce employees, and opened its public beta on November 9, 2021. In an interview, co-founder Richard Socher stated he wanted a search engine with a balance of privacy and personalization.

History 
The website was founded in 2020 by two former Salesforce employees, Bryan McCann and Richard Socher. Following the search engine's announcement of opening the public beta in 2021, it received $20 million in funding from Marc Benioff, the Salesforce founder.

In March 2022, the company launched YouWrite, a GPT-3 text generator for writing e-mails and other documents.

In December 2022, the company launched YouChat, a Generative Pre-trained Transformer-based chat bot, primarily based on OpenAI's GPT-3.5. It uses Google search for general search results and Microsoft Bing for more specific searches, such as code snippets.

Search results 
The search engine shows search results sorted by specific websites, for example, Reddit. These categories can be sorted by the user.  For web results, it uses Microsoft Bing's results.

You.com does not store users' IP addresses and does not collect users' information for targeting ads. You.com offers two modes: personal mode and private mode which is more confidential. As opposed to the personal mode, in private mode You.com claims to not store users' searches, share IP addresses with You.com partners, or collect any information about searching.

Reception 
You.com has received generally positive reviews, with the main criticism being the way it organizes information, which has been described as overwhelming by The Verge.

References

External links 
 

Internet search engines
Internet properties established in 2021